The Forest Preserve District of Cook County is a governmental commission in Cook County, Illinois, that owns and manages a network of open spaces, containing forest, prairie, wetland, streams, and lakes, that are mostly set aside as natural areas. Cook County contains Chicago, and is the center of the most densely populated urban metropolitan area in the Midwest. It contains facilities for recreation, as well as a zoo and a botanic garden.

Background

Most often being left more in their natural state, the Forest Preserves have a different purpose from urban parks; also they generally do not contain organized recreational facilities such as tennis courts or softball diamonds. They do contain hiking, bicycling, and riding trails, as well as facilities for nature and group activities, and they are heavily used for picnicking. They are administered by the Forest Preserve District of Cook County, a special taxation district that crosses municipal boundaries. The districts headquarters is located in River Forest near Harlem Avenue and Lake Street.

While the Forest Preserve District as a unit of government and municipal corporation is legally separate from Cook County, the latter's board of commissioners, the county board's president, commissioners and clerk hold the same offices ex officio concurrently, making up the Forest Preserve District Board of Commissioners.

In 1905, at the instigation of the Cook County Board of Commissioners and private nature groups partly guided by prominent landscape architect Jens Jensen, Illinois adopted a forest preserve act. However, defects in the law caused it to be declared inoperable. The Forest Preserve District Association was formed in 1911 and a new state law was adopted; however, the courts declared the 1911 law unconstitutional.  Finally in 1913, the State adopted a Forest Preserve Act that survived legal challenge. The 1913 law allowed a county board: 
A Cook County referendum required by the 1913 law was passed by voters in 1914, establishing the Forest Preserve District of Cook County, and the first Board meeting was held in February 1915.

Operations
In addition to owning and managing tens of thousands of acres of forest, meadow, and wetlands, both the Brookfield Zoo (managed by agreement with the Chicago Zoological Society) and the Chicago Botanic Gardens (managed by the Chicago Horticultural Society) are located on district land. The Forest Preserve District also maintains eleven public golf courses.  There are six nature centers used for programming and education, five campgrounds, and three swimming centers. In 2016, a tree-top zipline course was opened in west Cook County's Bemis Woods.

National sites 
The Ned Brown Forest Preserve contains Busse Woods, a National Natural Landmark.  The District also administers the Chicago Portage National Historic Site.  In addition, the District's Red Gate Woods was the war-time home of the Manhattan Project's first nuclear facility.

Conservation 
Biologists with the district monitor the health of area wild life, lands, and water.  This includes monitoring such populations as the number of fish in area rivers, and the return in the 21st century after a century of absence of such apex predators as the river otter.  Twenty-two sections of district land, which contain high quality conservation resources, have been designated as Illinois Nature Preserves allowing greater management and protection.

The International Dark-Sky Association (IDA) conservation program designated the Forest District's Palos Preserves an Urban Night Sky Place.  After review, the IDA determined that within the context of its substantial urban setting, the preserve's "planning and design actively promote an authentic nighttime experience in the midst of significant artificial light."

Trail systems 
There are thirteen trail systems within the preserve district, they are the:
Arie Crown Forest trail system
Burnham Greenway trail system
Busse Woods bicycle trail
Centennial and I&M Canal trail system
Deer Grove trail system
Des Plaines River Trail system
North Branch Trail system
Palos Trail system
Poplar Creek trail system
Sag Valley trail system
Salt Creek trail system
Thorn Creek trail system
Tinley Creek trail system

Facilities by region

Region 1: Northwest Cook County
Poplar Creek Division

Includes: Spring Lake Preserve, Crabtree Preserve, Arthur L. Janura Preserve

Activity Areas
 Barrington Road Pond
 Beverly Lake
 Bluff Springs Fen
 Bode East
 Bode Lake
 Crabtree Nature Center
 Great Egret Family Picnic Area
 Old Stover Trailhead
 Penny Road Pond
 Poplar Creek Bicycle Lot
 Poplar Creek Equestrian Parking
 Poplar Creek Model Airplane Flying Field
 Shoe Factory Road Woods
 Spring Creek Valley Headwaters
 Spring Lake Nature Preserve

Trail Systems
 Crabtree Preserve (Paved)
 Poplar Creek (Paved)
 Poplar Creek (Unpaved)
 Spring Lake (Unpaved)

Region 2: Northwest Cook County
Northwest Division

Includes: Deer Grove Preserve, Jens Jensen Preserve, Paul Douglas Preserve, Ned Brown Preserve

Activity Areas
 Baker's Lake Overlook
 Baker's Lake Younghusband Prairie
 Busse Forest-Central
 Busse Forest-North
 Busse Forest-South
 Busse Forest-West
 Busse Forest Elk Pasture
 Busse Forest Main Dam
 Busse Lake Beisner Road Access
 Busse Lake Boating Center
 Camp Alphonse
 Camp Reinberg
 Deer Grove
 Deer Grove-East
 Deer Grove-West
 Deer Grove Lake
 Grassy Ridge Meadow
 Highland Woods Driving Range
 Highland Woods Golf Course
 Ned Brown Meadow
 Woodland Meadow

Trail Systems
 Busse Forest (Paved)
 Deer Grove (Paved)
 Deer Grove (Unpaved)
 Paul Douglas (Paved)

Region 3: North Cook County
Indian Boundary Division, Des Plaines Division

Includes: Seymour Simon Preserve

Activity Areas
 Allison Woods
 Axehead Lake
 Beck Lake
 Belleau Lake
 Big Bend Lake
 Blandings Grove Family Picnic Area
 Blue Beach Family Picnic Area
 Camp Baden Powell
 Camp Dan Beard
 Camp Ground Road Woods
 Camp Pine Woods
 Catherine Chevalier Woods
 Che-Che-Pin-Qua Woods
 Chippewa Woods
 Dam No. 1 Woods-East
 Dam No. 1 Woods-West
 Dam No. 2 Woods
 Dam No. 4 Woods-East
 Evans Field
 Fullerton Woods
 Fullerton Woods Family Picnic Area
 Harry H. Semrow Driving Range
 Indian Boundary Family Picnic Area
 Indian Boundary Golf Course
 Iroquois Woods
 Irving Park Road Canoe Landing
 Jerome Huppert Woods
 John E. Traeger Family Picnic Area
 Kloempken Prairie
 Lake Avenue Woods-East
 Lake Avenue Woods-West
 Lions Woods
 Massasauga Family Picnic Area
 Northwestern Woods
 Potawatomi Lake
 Potawatomi Woods
 River Bend Family Picnic Area
 River Trail Nature Center
 Robinson Homestead Family Picnic Area
 Robinson Woods-South
 Schiller Model Airplane Flying Field
 Schiller Playfield
 Schiller Pond
 Schiller Woods-East
 Schiller Woods-South
 Schiller Woods-West
 Sunset Bridge Meadow

Trail System
 Des Plaines (Unpaved)

Region 4: North Cook County
North Branch Division, Skokie Division

Includes: William N. Erickson Preserves, George F. Nixon Forest, Frank Bobrytzke Forest, Clayton F. Smith Preserves, Roman Pucinski Preserve

Activity Areas
 Billy Caldwell Golf Course
 Blue Star Memorial Woods
 Bunker Hill
 Caldwell Woods
 Calvin R. Sutker Grove
 Camp Adahi
 Camp Glenview
 Chick Evans Golf Course
 Chipilly Woods
 Edgebrook Golf Course
 Edgebrook Woods
 Erickson Woods
 Forest Glen Woods
 Forest Way Grove
 Glen Grove Equestrian Center
 Glenview Woods
 Harms Woods-Central
 Harms Woods-North
 Harms Woods-South
 Irene C. Hernandez Family Picnic Area
 LaBagh Woods
 Linne Woods
 Little House of Glencoe
 Mary Mix McDonald Woods
 Mathew Bieszczat–Volunteer Resource Center
 Miami Woods
 Perkins Woods
 St. Paul Woods
 Sidney Yates Flatwoods
 Skokie Lagoons
 Somme Nature Preserve
 Somme Prairie Grove
 Somme Woods
 Thaddeus S. "Ted" Lechowicz Woods
 Tower Road
 Tower Road Boat Launch
 Turnbull Woods
 Watersmeet Woods
 Wayside Woods
 Whealan Pool Aquatic Center

Special Activity Site
 Chicago Botanic Garden

Trail Systems
 North Branch (Paved)
 North Branch (Unpaved)

Region 5: West Cook County
Salt Creek Division

Activity Areas
 Andrew Toman Grove
 Bemis Woods-North
 Bemis Woods-South
 Brezina Woods
 Brookfield Woods
 Callahan Grove
 Cermak Family Aquatic Center
 Cermak Quarry
 Cermak Woods
 Cummings Square (General Headquarters)
 G.A.R. Woods
 Hal Tyrrell Trailside Museum
 LaGrange Park Woods
 Maywood Grove
 McCormick Woods
 Meadowlark Golf Course
 Miller Meadow-North
 Miller Meadow-South
 National Grove-North
 National Grove-South
 Ottawa Trail Woods-North
 Ottawa Trail Woods-South
 Plank Road Meadow Boat Launch
 Possum Hollow Woods
 Quercus Woods Family Picnic Area
 Salt Creek Woods
 Schuth's Grove
 Silver  Creek Family Picnic Area
 Stony Ford Canoe Landing
 Thatcher Woods
 Thatcher Woods Glen
 Thomas Jefferson Woods
 Twenty-Sixth Street Woods-East
 Twenty-Sixth Street Woods-West
 Westchester Woods
 White Eagle Woods-North
 White Eagle Woods-South
 Wolf Road Prairie
 Zoo Woods

Trail Systems
 Salt Creek (Paved)
 Salt Creek (Unpaved)
 Salt Creek Greenway (Paved)

Special Activity Sites
 Brookfield Zoo
 Chicago Portage National Historic Site

Region 6: Southwest Cook County
Salt Creek Division, Palos Division

Includes: Palos Preserves

Activity Areas
 Arie Crown Forest
 Belly Deep Slough
 Buffalo Woods-Central
 Buffalo Woods Family Picnic Area
 Buffalo Woods-North
 Buffalo Woods-South
 Bullfrog Lake
 Camp Kiwanis Equestrian Staging Area
 Columbia Woods
 Country Lane Woods
 Cranberry Slough
 Crawdad Slough
 Crooked Creek Woods
 Dan McMahon Woods
 Henry De Tonty Woods
 Hickory Hills Woods
 Hidden Pond Woods-East
 Hidden Pond Woods-West
 Joe's Pond
 John Husar I&M Canal–Bicycle Trail Parking Lot
 Lake Ida
 Little Red Schoolhouse Nature Center
 Maple Lake Boating Center
 Maple Lake-East
 Maple Lake
 Maple Lake Overlook
 Morrill Meadow
 Palos Fen
 Paw Paw Woods
 Pioneer Woods
 Pulaski Woods
 Pulaski Woods-East
 Pulaski Woods-South–Mountain Bike Staging Area
 Red Gate Woods
 Saganashkee Slough-Central
 Saganashkee Slough-East
 Saganashkee Slough Boat Launch
 Spears Woods
 Sundown Meadow
 Theodore Stone Forest
 Tuma Lake
 White Oak Woods
 Willow Springs Woods
 Wolf Road Woods

Trail Systems
 Arie Crown (Unpaved)
 Centennial (Unpaved)
 John Husar I&M Canal (Paved)
 Palos (Unpaved)

Region 7: Southwest Cook County
Sag Valley Division

Includes: Black Partridge Preserve, Cap Sauer's Preserve, John J. Duffy Preserve, Edward M. Sneed Forest

Activity Areas
 Bergman Slough
 Black Partridge Woods
 Cap Sauers Holding
 Cherry Hill Woods
 Forty Acre Woods
 Horsetail Lake
 McGinnis Slough
 McClaughrey Spring Woods
 Orland Grassland
 Orland Grove
 Paddock Woods
 Palos Park Woods-North
 Palos Park Woods-South
 Papoose Lake
 Sag Quarries
 Sagawau Environmental Learning Center
 Southland Volunteer Resource Center
 Swallow Cliff Woods-North
 Swallow Cliff Woods-South
 Tampier Greenway Family Picnic Area
 Tampier Lake Boating Center
 Tampier Lake-North
 Tampier Lake-West
 Teason's Woods

Trail Systems
 Centennial (Unpaved)
 Sag Valley (Unpaved)

Region 8: South Cook County
Tinley Creek Division

Includes: South Green Belt Preserve

Activity Areas
Arrowhead Lake
 Bachelor's Grove Woods
 Bartel Grassland
 Bobolink Family Picnic Area
 Bremen Grove
 Bur Oak Woods
 Camp Falcon
 Camp Sullivan
 Carlson Springs Woods
 Catalina Grove Family Picnic Area
 Coopers Hawk Grove Family Picnic Area
 Elizabeth A. Conkey Forest-North
 Elizabeth A. Conkey Forest-South
 Flossmoor Road Bicycle Lot
 George W. Dunne National Driving Range
 George W. Dunne National Golf Course
 Goeselville Grove Family Picnic Area
 Midlothian Meadows
 Midlothian Reservoir
 Rubio Woods
 St. Mihiel Woods-East
 Tinley Creek Model Airplane Flying Field
 Tinley Creek Woods
 Turtlehead Lake
 Vollmer Road Grove
 Yankee Woods

Trail Systems
 Tinley Creek (Paved)
 Tinley Creek (Unpaved)

Region 9: Southeast Cook County
Calumet Division, Thorn Creek Division

Includes: Plum Creek Preserve

Activity Areas
 Beaubien Woods
 Beaubien Woods Boat Launch
 Brownell Woods
 Burnham Prairie Nature Preserve
 Burnham Woods Golf Course
 Calumet City Playfield
 Calumet City Prairie
 Calumet Woods
 Clayhole Woods
 Dan Ryan Woods-91st Street
 Dan Ryan Woods-Central
 Dan Ryan Woods-East
 Dan Ryan Woods-North
 Dan Ryan Woods-South
 Dan Ryan Woods-West
 Dixmoor Playfield
 Eggers Grove
 Flatfoot Lake
 Glenwood Woods-North
 Glenwood Woods-South
 Green Lake Family Aquatic Center
 Green Lake Woods
 Indian Hill Woods
 Joe Louis "The Champ" Golf Course
 Joe Orr Woods
 Jurgensen Woods
 Kickapoo Woods
 King's Grove
 Lansing Woods
 Little Calumet Boat Launch
 Michael J. O'Malley Preserve
 North Creek Meadow
 Plum Creek Play Meadow
 Powderhorn Lake
 River Oaks Golf Course
 Sand Ridge Nature Center
 Sand Ridge Prairie Nature Preserve
 Sauk Lake
 Sauk Trail Woods-Central
 Sauk Trail Woods-East
 Sauk Trail Woods-North
 Sauk Trail Woods-South
 Schubert's Woods
 Shabbona Woods
 Sweet Woods
 Thorn Creek Model Airplane Flying Field
 Thornton-Lansing Road–Nature Preserve (Zander Woods)
 Wampum Lake
 Wentworth Prairie
 Whistler Woods
 Woodrow Wilson Woods

Trail Systems
 Burnham Greenway (Paved)
 Major Taylor (Paved)
 Plum Creek (Unpaved)
 Thorn Creek (Paved)
 Thorn Creek (Unpaved)

See also 
Chicago Portage National Historic Site
Illinois Nature Preserves
Red Gate Woods
North Creek Woods
Sauk Trail Woods
Schiller Woods magic water pump

References

External links 

 Forest Preserve District of Cook County - official website
  Forest Preserve Map
 Forest Preserve Golf
 Cook County Forest Preserve Photographs - digital images from the UIC Library collections

Forest Preserves
Nature reserves in Illinois
Forests of Illinois
1914 establishments in Illinois